Gaudreault is a surname and may refer to:

 Armand Gaudreault (1921–2013), Canadian ice hockey player
 Leo Gaudreault (1902–1950), Canadian ice hockey player
 Maryse Gaudreault (born 1959), Canadian politician
 Sylvain Gaudreault (born 1970), Canadian politician